The following are players who has scored three or more goals in a match (hat-trick) in an international match against a national side for the Philippine national football team. The latest hat-trick for the national team was made by Bienvenido Marañón in a 2020 AFF Championship match against Singapore on December 18, 2021. Hat-tricks conceded by the Philippines to opposing national teams along with the scorer are also listed here.

Hat-tricks for the Philippines
Key

Table
The result is presented with the Philippines' score first.

Hat-tricks conceded by the Philippines
Key

Table
The result is presented with the Philippines' score first.

References

Hat-tricks
Philippines
Philippines